The Longest Night is a 2019 Ecuadorian drama film directed by Gabriela Calvache. It was selected as the Ecuadorian entry for the Best International Feature Film at the 92nd Academy Awards, but it was not nominated.

Plot
A prostitute exploited by a mafia boss tries to break free and pursue justice.

Cast
 Noëlle Schönwald as Dana
 Cristian Mercado as Julián
 Jaime Tamariz as Nelson

See also
 List of submissions to the 92nd Academy Awards for Best International Feature Film
 List of Ecuadorian submissions for the Academy Award for Best International Feature Film

References

External links
 
 

2019 films
2019 drama films
Ecuadorian drama films
2010s Spanish-language films